Colin David Hugh Jones  (born 12 December 1947) is a British historian of France and professor of history at Queen Mary University of London.

Jones attended Hampton Grammar School. He then studied at Jesus College, Oxford, 1967–71, where he obtained a first-class honours degree in modern history and modern languages (French) and St Antony's College, Oxford, from where he obtained his Doctor of Philosophy degree in 1978.

He began working as a temporary lecturer in history at Newcastle University, 1972–73 before moving on to the University of Exeter, where he remained until 1995. He was then appointed professor of history in the history department of the University of Warwick, where he stayed until 2006.

He is known especially for his important history of Paris, Paris, Biography of a City, which won the Enid MacLeod Prize of the Franco-British Society as the book published in 2004 which contributed most to Anglo-French understanding.

Jones was appointed Commander of the Order of the British Empire (CBE) in the 2014 Birthday Honours for services to historical research and higher education.

Main publications 
Charity and 'Bienfaisance': The Treatment of the Poor in the Montpellier Region, 1740-1815, Cambridge: Cambridge University Press, 1982, xvi + 317 pp.
The Longman Companion to the French Revolution, London: Longman, 1988, xiv + 473 pp.; Paperback edition, 1990
The Charitable Imperative: Hospitals and Nursing in Ancien Régime and Revolutionary France, London: Routledge, November 1989, xiii + 317 pp.
(With John Ardagh), Cultural Atlas of France, New York and Oxford: Facts on File, 1991, 240 pp.; French, German, Dutch, Polish translations
The Cambridge Illustrated History of France, Cambridge: Cambridge University Press, 1994, 352 pp. Paperback edition, 1999; German, Korean, Chinese translations
(With Laurence Brockliss) The Medical World of Early Modern France, Oxford: Clarendon Press, 1997, xii + 960pp.
The Great Nation. France from Louis XV to the 1715-99, London: Penguin, 2002, xxx + 651pp.; US hardback edition published by Columbia University Press, 2003
Madame de Pompadour and her Image, London: National Gallery Publications with Yale University Press, 2002), 176 pp. Associated with the international exhibition on the same topic held in Versailles, Munich and at the National Gallery, London, 2002
Paris: Biography of a City, London: Allen Lane/Penguin, 2004, xxviii + 643 pp. US edition, 2005, Penguin/Viking; paperback, 2006; Russian and Chinese translations. Awarded the Enid McLeod Prize of the Franco-British Society as the book published in 2004 which contributed most to Anglo-French understanding.
The Fall of Robespierre: 24 Hours in Revolutionary Paris. Oxford University Press, 2021.

References 

Colin Jones personal website, Queen Mary, University of London, retrieved 2008-05-20
Academic Profile, retrieved 2008-05-20
Publications, retrieved 2008-05-20
Current Research, retrieved 2008-05-20
Professor Colin Jones profile at Queen Mary, University of London, Department of History, retrieved 2008-05-20
Colin Jones, Penguin UK Authors, retrieved 2008-05-20
Authors represented by literary agent Felicity Bryan, retrieved 2008-05-20

British historians
Alumni of Jesus College, Oxford
Alumni of St Antony's College, Oxford
Academics of Newcastle University
Academics of the University of Exeter
Academics of the University of Warwick
Academics of Queen Mary University of London
Commanders of the Order of the British Empire
Presidents of the Royal Historical Society
Living people
1947 births